Burnette Glacier is a steep glacier in the Admiralty Mountains, flowing southeast between Honeycomb Ridge and Quartermain Point into Moubray Bay. It was mapped by the United States Geological Survey from surveys and from U.S. Navy air photos, 1960–62, and named by the Advisory Committee on Antarctic Names for Airman 2nd Class Robert L. Burnette, United States Air Force, who perished in a crash of a C-124 Globemaster in this vicinity in 1958.

References
 

Glaciers of Borchgrevink Coast